Visa requirements for Qatari citizens are administrative entry restrictions by the authorities of other states placed on citizens of the Qatar.  As of 13 April 2021, Qatari citizens had visa-free or visa on arrival access to 95 countries and territories, ranking the Qatari passport 56th in terms of travel freedom according to the Henley Passport Index. They also had the right to take up jobs in those countries and vice versa.

Visa requirements map

Visa requirements

See also
 Visa policy of Qatar
 Qatari passport
 List of nationalities forbidden at border

References and Notes
References

Notes

Foreign relations of Qatar
Qatar